Disciples of the Truth is the third album released by Burrito Deluxe, issued in 2007.

Track listing 
 "Out of the Wilderness" 4:24
 "Sun Will Rise" 4:17
 "Front Row Seats to Heaven" 3:19
 "Disciples of the Truth" 3:57
 "Wichita" 3:55
 "On a Roll" 3:37
 "When the Summer's Over" 4:43
 "Encino" 3:31
 "When It Comes Down on You" 4:12
 "Wrong Side of Town" 4:12
 "Midnight at a Red Light" 4:00
 "Who's Gonna Love You" 5:57

Personnel 
Burrito Deluxe
 Carlton Moody - banjo, guitar, mandolin, vocals
 Walter Egan - guitar, vocals
 Richard Bell - B-3 organ, Mellotron, synthesizer, Wurlitzer, Clavinet, acoustic piano, accordion 
 Jeff "Stick" Davis - bass
 Bryan Owings - drums

Additional Personnel
 Sneaky Pete Kleinow - pedal steel guitar
 Cindy Cashdollar, Mike Daly, Al Perkins - pedal steel, dobro
 Daniel Dugmore - pedal steel, banjo
 Barry "Byrd" Burton, Richard Ferreira - guitars
 Craig Krampf, Rick Lonow - percussion
 Joy Lynn White, Rick Schell, Blue Miller - backing vocals

References

2007 albums
The Flying Burrito Brothers albums